Tamsin Olivia Egerton (born Tamsin Olivia Egerton-Dick; 26 November 1988) is a British actress known for her roles as Chelsea Parker in the 2007 film St Trinian's, Holly Goodfellow in the 2005 film Keeping Mum, and Guinevere in the 2011 television series Camelot.

Early life
Egerton-Dick was born on 26 November 1988 in Surrey, England, to Michael Dick and wife Nicola Egerton. Her father is a businessman. She began her acting career at age 6, following her older sister, Sophia, to a local youth theatre. Egerton-Dick attended the independent Ditcham Park School in Hampshire, where she reports experiencing bullying due to being a child actor.

Career
In 2001, she played Mary Lennox (as a child) in a Royal Shakespeare Company musical production of The Secret Garden, and appeared as young Morgaine in the television miniseries The Mists of Avalon. She soon chose to shorten her surname to Egerton to improve her career prospects. The following year she played Princess Elenora in the children's television series Sir Gadabout: The Worst Knight in the Land.

Egerton's film debut was as Holly Goodfellow, a precocious vicar's daughter in the black comedy Keeping Mum (2005). , where she performed a nude scene. Her breakthrough role was as Chelsea, a member of a posh clique in St. Trinian's (2007). She reprised the role in its sequel St Trinian's II: The Legend of Fritton's Gold in 2009. Two years later, she starred in Chalet Girl with Felicity Jones, Ed Westwick, and Bill Nighy. In the same year she portrayed Guinevere in the historical fantasy drama series Camelot. In 2013, Egerton appeared in Michael Winterbottom's biopic The Look of Love which was based on the life of strip-club owner Paul Raymond.

Personal life
Egerton has been in a long-term relationship with American actor Josh Hartnett, first announced in 2012. They have a daughter (born 2015), a second child (born 2017), and a third child (born 2019). In March 2022, Hartnett revealed he and Egerton had married in November 2021. They reside in Surrey, England.

Filmography

Film

Television

References

External links
 

1988 births
Living people
English television actresses
English film actresses
English musical theatre actresses
Royal Shakespeare Company members
English child actresses
People educated at Ditcham Park School
21st-century English actresses